Doctor Vlimmen  is a 1977 Dutch film directed by Guido Pieters, starring Peter Faber.

External links 
 

Dutch drama films
1978 films
1970s Dutch-language films
Films based on Dutch novels
Films directed by Guido Pieters